Samuelston (Scots: Sammelstoun) is a small town just outside of Haddington, East Lothian. It has a population of 957.

George Ker, laird of Samuelston, supervised building work at the church of Ladykirk for James IV. His daughter Nichola Ker married Alexander Home, 2nd Lord Home.

References

External Links 

  Haddington's History Society - Paper on Samuelston

Villages in East Lothian